Goethals was an ocean-going hopper dredge operated by the United States Army Corps of Engineers named for George Washington Goethals, who supervised much of the building of the Panama Canal.

The dredge's keel was laid at Bethlehem Shipbuilding Corporation's Fore River Plant, Quincy, Massachusetts, on 5 October 1936 with launch in August 1937 and delivery in December. The dredge was operated under the direction of the Philadelphia District of the United States Army Corps of Engineers until its retirement in 1982.

References

External links
 Dredge Goethals at Jacksonville, ca. March 1974.
 Goethals dredge angle view port, from Wesley E. Johnson, Dredge history interviewee.
 Dredge Goethals. no date, ca. 1957-63.
 Goethals dredge at Virginia Beach November 14, 1974
 Goethals dredge bottom looking fwd., Maryland Dry Dock Co. December 5, 1947.
 Goethals, underside stern, Maryland [Dry Dock] Co. December 5, 1947. Showing twin screws

Ships of the United States Army
1937 ships
Dredgers
United States Army Corps of Engineers